Mondays at Racine is a 2012 short documentary film directed by Cynthia Wade, about two sisters who open their Long Island hair salon to women diagnosed with cancer, every third Monday of the month. The film was nominated for the 2013 Academy Award for Best Documentary (Short Subject).

After being nominated for an Academy Award the film was released along with all the other 15 Oscar-nominated short films in theaters by ShortsHD.

References

External links

Mondays at Racine at HBO

2012 films
2012 short documentary films
Documentary films about cancer
Documentary films about women
Films shot in New York (state)
American short documentary films
Women in New York City
American hairdressers
Long Island
2010s American films